Ataru may refer to:

People
, Japanese singer-songwriter and actress
, Japanese football player
, Japanese film director and screenwriter

Characters
Ataru Kinniku, a character from the fictional wrestling manga Kinnikuman
Ataru Moroboshi, the main character from Rumiko Takahashi's manga and anime series Urusei Yatsura

Other
Ataru (TV series), TBS series

Japanese unisex given names